Midnighters 3: Blue Noon is a young adult novel by Scott Westerfeld.  Blue Noon is the third and final book in his Midnighters series and was released in 2005 through EOS Books, a now defunct branch of HarperCollins.

Plot summary 
When time freezes in the middle of the day during a school pep rally, the Midnighters have a problem. The secret hour is slowly making its way into the real world. The last book in the Midnighters trilogy is all about the adventure of trying to keep the secret hour in the secret hour.

The Midnighters begin to experience the secret hour more and more frequently during daylight hours. To make matters worse, Rex's darkling side cannot always control itself, and may be becoming stronger. By using Madeline and other resources, the Midnighters find out that on the night of Samhain (Halloween), the Secret Hour will expand, and more of the Earth will be sucked up. This is because there is a "rip" in true midnight, which allows non-midnighters to slip into the blue time, that is expanding like a seam in fabric. While trying to keep people out of these dangerous zones, Jessica has some trouble with her curious little sister Beth. True midnight (usually confined to the secret hour) will last for the whole day, and all humans and creatures within it will be awake, no longer 'stiff'. This will allow the darklings to feast once again upon the creatures of day-unless the five teens find a way to stop it from happening.

When Jessica and her boyfriend Jonathan manage to stop the "blue time" from spreading to the whole world, Jessica unfortunately gets sucked into the "blue time". To Jonathan and the whole Midnighter's teams dismay, she will forever be trapped in the blue time, only able to live for an hour of every day.  Jessica's parents become very sad about their daughter's "disappearance" and are still grieving her loss when Beth comes to visit Jess for the last time. Both sisters share an emotional time with each other before Jonathan has his moment to say goodbye. Finally, with a half-hour to spare, Jonathan takes Jessica and Beth on their last flight through the blue time.

References

2005 American novels

American fantasy novels
American science fiction novels
American young adult novels
Contemporary fantasy novels
HarperCollins books
Novels by Scott Westerfeld
Novels set in Oklahoma